Japan LPGA Tour Championship Ricoh Cup is the final event of golf's LPGA of Japan Tour season. It is usually played in November and in recent years at the Miyazaki Country Club, Miyazaki, Miyazaki. It was founded in 1979.  The winner receives an invite to the next year's Women's British Open.

Tournament hosts

Course
Miyazaki Country Club in 2014

Winners

References

External links
 

LPGA of Japan Tour events
1979 establishments in Japan
Recurring sporting events established in 1979